Halzen Mesa is an oblong islandlike mesa,  long and rising to , that is the largest and easternmost of three mesas in the Insel Range, McMurdo Dry Valleys, in Victoria Land. The upper surface is relatively level but the periphery is marked by abrupt cliffs that rise 500 to 600 m above the floor of Barwick Valley and McKelvey Valley. Named by the Advisory Committee on Antarctic Names in 2005 after Francis Halzen, Physics Department, University of Wisconsin–Madison, who in 1988 conceived of AMANDA, the Antarctic Muon And Neutrino Detector Array at Amundsen–Scott South Pole Station; United States Antarctic Program principal investigator in a project to build the IceCube Neutrino Observatory at the South Pole Station in six field seasons beginning 2004–05.

References

Landforms of Victoria Land